Mohamed Abdullah may refer to:

 Mohamed Abdullah (footballer) (born 1981), Egyptian footballer
 Mohamed Abdullah (swimmer) (born 1973), Emirati swimmer
 Mohamed Abu Abdullah (born 1981), Bangladeshi track and field sprint athlete
 Mohamed Abdullah (Emirati athlete) (born 1964), Emirati Olympic sprinter
 Mohamed Dzaiddin Abdullah (born 1938), Malaysian judge
 Mohamed Sayed Abdulla (born 1974), Egyptian field hockey player
 Mohamed Abdullah (Iraqi athlete) (born 1935), Iraqi pole vaulter